Jack Wood can refer to:

 Jack Wood (Australian cricketer) (born 1996), Australian cricketer
 Jack Wood (English cricketer) (born 1994), English cricketer
 Jack Wood (director) (1924–2007), American television director
 Jack Wood (footballer) (1889–1914), Australian rules footballer
 Jack Wood (racing driver) (born 2000), American racing driver
 Leo Wood (1882–1929), American songwriter sometimes known as Jack Wood